is a Japanese tennis player.

Takahashi has a career high ATP singles ranking of 238 achieved on 7 August 2017. He also has a career high ATP doubles ranking of 414 achieved on 20 November 2017.

Takahashi made his ATP main draw debut at the 2017 Rakuten Japan Open Tennis Championships after defeating Adrián Menéndez-Maceiras and Vasek Pospisil in qualifying.

External links

1997 births
Living people
Japanese male tennis players
Sportspeople from Yokohama
21st-century Japanese people